Josip Barišić (born 14 November 1986 in Osijek) is a Croatian football forward currently playing for Vukovar 1991 in the Treća HNL Istok.

Club career
Barišić, also known as Đozla, started his career playing at youth level for his hometown club Osijek, with whom he signed a professional five-year contract in May 2005. He made his first team debut in his team's 6-0 away loss against HNK Hajduk Split in the first round of the 2005–06 Prva HNL season. After two seasons at the club, during which he also debuted for the Croatia U20 team, he went on loan - first to the Slovenian FC Koper and then to the Druga HNL team NK Slavonac CO before returning to Osijek for three and a half further seasons. In February 2012 he signed for the Ukrainian Premier League team PFC Oleksandriya, but failed to establish himself in the first team squad and soon returned to Croatia. His next club was RNK Split in early 2013, which he left that summer, citing a lack of regular appearances as the cause, and signed again for his first club NK Osijek.

In early 2015, he joined Polish Ekstraklasa club Zawisza Bydgoszcz. On 23 June 2015, he joined Piast Gliwice, after Zawisza was relegated.

On 10 June 2019 Stal Mielec announced, that they had signed Barišić on a 1-year deal. His contract was terminated on 10 January 2020.

Honours

Club
Arka Gdynia
 Polish Cup: 2016–17

References

External links
 
 Josip Barišić at Sportnet.hr 
 

1986 births
Living people
Footballers from Osijek
Association football forwards
Croatian footballers
Croatia youth international footballers
NK Osijek players
FC Koper players
FC Oleksandriya players
RNK Split players
Zawisza Bydgoszcz players
Piast Gliwice players
Arka Gdynia players
HNK Cibalia players
Stal Mielec players
HNK Vukovar '91 players
Croatian Football League players
Slovenian PrvaLiga players
Ukrainian Premier League players
Ekstraklasa players
First Football League (Croatia) players
Croatian expatriate footballers
Expatriate footballers in Slovenia
Expatriate footballers in Ukraine
Expatriate footballers in Poland
Croatian expatriate sportspeople in Slovenia
Croatian expatriate sportspeople in Ukraine
Croatian expatriate sportspeople in Poland